Revolution Ballroom is the sixth solo (and eighth overall) studio album by Nina Hagen, released in 1993.

Track listing

Note
"L'amore" is sung in Italian, "Berlin" is sung in German, French and English, "Omhaidakhandi" is sung in Sanskrit.

Personnel
Nina Hagen – vocals
Phil Manzanera – guitar, drum programming
Livingstone Brown – bass
Andy Mackay – saxophone
Olle Romo – keyboards, drum programming
David A. Stewart – keyboards, background vocals, drum programming
Keith Bessey – drum programming
Clive Mayuyu – drums
Porl Young – drum programming
Nigel Butler – bass, keyboards, drum programming
Pam Hoog – voices
Matteo Saggese – keyboards
Archbishop Desmond Tutu – voice sample
Billy Liesegang – guitar, harmonica
Bernhard Potschka – guitar
Nelson Mandela – voice sample
 Durga McBroom - backing vocals
Sacha  – wah wah guitar

1993 albums
Nina Hagen albums
Albums produced by Phil Manzanera
Mercury Records albums